Olive Grove Records is an independent record label based in Glasgow, Scotland. It was established in 2010 by Halina Rifai and Lloyd Meredith, Glasgow-based music bloggers.

History 
Frustrated that the local music they liked wasn't getting released, Halina Rifai and Lloyd Meredith of the Podcart and Peenko music blogs co-founded the label in 2010. Their debut release was "Battleships & Kettle Chips" by Randolph's Leap in November 2010. The label's name comes from the song "An Olive Grove Facing The Sea" by the band Snow Patrol.

The Archipelago EPs 
In July 2018, it was announced that the label had been awarded Creative Scotland Open Project Funding to support the release of a series of EPs by up-and-coming Scottish based artists with little or no studio experience. Launching in 2019, releases are expected from Chrissy Barnacle, Pocket Knife, Moonsoup, Circle Meets Dot, Lux Canyon, and Jared Celosse.

Artists 
The following artists have released music on the Olive Grove label:

Releases

References 

Scottish record labels
Record labels established in 2010
British independent record labels